William Henry Ellis may refer to:
William Henry Ellis (engineer) (1860–1945), British civil engineer and steel maker
William Henry Ellis (politician) (1819–1858), English-born political figure in Newfoundland
William Henry Ellis (businessman) (1864–1923), American businessman 
William Ellis (actor), British actor, voice artist and podcaster

See also
William Ellis (disambiguation)